Immanuel is a name originating in the biblical Hebrew name , meaning "God with us". The name, now common to both Jewish and Christian naming traditions, originates with the biblical character Immanuel, with numerous variants appearing over time, including first names Amanuel (አማኑኤል) in Ethiopia, Emanuele in Italy, Imanol in Basque, Manuel in Portuguese and Spanish, Emmanouil (Εμμανουήλ) in Greek, and a French female variation, Emmanuelle.

References

Masculine given names
Theophoric names
Modern names of Hebrew origin